Lechria is a genus of crane fly in the family Limoniidae.

Distribution
Papua New Guinea, Irian Jaya, Nepal, India, Java, Malaysia, Sumatra, Philippines & Australia

Species
L. albidipes Alexander, 1947
L. angustaxillaris Alexander, 1948
L. argentosigna Alexander, 1958
L. argyrospila Alexander, 1957
L. bengalensis Brunetti, 1911
L. coorgensis Alexander, 1960
L. delicatior Alexander, 1948
L. fuscomarginata Alexander, 1956
L. interstitialis Alexander, 1953
L. leucopeza de Meijere, 1914
L. longicellula Alexander, 1950
L. lucida de Meijere, 1911
L. luzonica Alexander, 1929
L. nehruana Alexander, 1956
L. philippinensis Alexander, 1925
L. rufithorax Alexander, 1920
L. singularis Skuse, 1890
L. sublaevis Alexander, 1920

References

Limoniidae
Nematocera genera
Diptera of Asia
Diptera of Australasia